Boro Chele is a 2017 Bangladeshi telefilm written and directed by Mizanur Rahman Aryan. It features Ziaul Faruq Apurba and Mehazabien Chowdhury in lead roles. The telefilm premiered on Channel Nine on the occasion on Eid al-Adha. It marks as the most viewed Bangladeshi telefilm on YouTube.

Cast 
 Ziaul Faruq Apurba as Rashed
 Mehazabien Chowdhury as Riya
 Khalequzzaman as Rashed's father
 Sheli Ahsan as Rashed's mother
 Golam Rabbani Mintu
 Shanta Rahman
 Shamim
 Bashar Bappy
 Bappa Russell
 Saifur Rahman Chowdhury
 Bijoy
 Irfaan as Rony, Rashed's youngest brother
 Anisha as Jenny, Rashed's niece

Soundtrack 
The telefilm soundtrack was composed by Sajid Sarkar. The telefilm used only a song titled Tai Tomar Kheyal sung by Miftah Zaman and lyrics written by Shomeshwar Oli.

References

External links 
 
 

Bangladeshi drama television series
Bangladeshi television films
Bengali-language television programming in Bangladesh
Films scored by Sajid Sarkar
Channel 9 (Bangladeshi TV channel) original programming